Jessica Lyn Keen (September 24, 1975 – March 16, 1991) was a murder victim killed in Foster Chapel Cemetery in West Jefferson, Ohio. Her case was profiled on the television program Unsolved Mysteries and On the Case with Paula Zahn as well as Dead Silent on Investigation Discovery.

Before the murder

Jessica Lyn Keen, a 15-year-old girl from Columbus, Ohio was a model student, an honor student and a cheerleader. However, she quit cheerleading and her grades dropped after meeting a boy in her school, 18 year old Shawn Thompson, and falling in love. Her parents objected to her seeing the young man but did not know what to do.

On March 4, 1991 they sought help at a free counseling center in Columbus. The home for troubled teens, Huckleberry House, offered temporary residence for two weeks, individual and family counseling sessions.

Body discovered

After being missing for two days, in the early morning of March 17th, Keen's body was found at the back of Foster Chapel Cemetery, 20 miles from the teen facility. She had been raped and badly beaten. She was still wearing her ring and watch, but a pendant with the word "taken" that her boyfriend gifted her was nowhere to be found.

Her boyfriend was the prime suspect, but DNA tests proved he was not responsible. Police theorized that she had escaped her abductors and ran to the cemetery. Evidence in the cemetery shows she tried to hide behind grave stones—a pair of her socks was found, and a knee imprint in the mud behind a grave stone was found with or near the socks. She was killed near a fence in the cemetery, presumably by her abductors, who had followed her.

Her family has since placed a cross with her name on it where her body was discovered near the fence in the cemetery.

Arrest
On April 9, 2008, police in Burlington, North Carolina arrested Marvin Lee Smith Jr. Based on DNA evidence, Smith was charged with unlawful sexual conduct on Keen, a felony, and was extradited to Ohio to face charges.

In 2009, Smith pleaded guilty to first degree murder in a Madison County courtroom, confirming he had raped and murdered Keen. Evidence showed Keen had escaped his car and run into Foster Chapel Cemetery, where she collided with a fence post and fell. Keen was then beat to death with a tombstone, that was discarded over the fence nearby. Reports show that police had found bloodied pieces of a tombstone. In exchange for his admission of guilt, Smith avoided a death penalty trial that was set for March 2009. He pleaded guilty to one charge of aggravated murder, with specifications of rape and murder, and was sentenced to 30 years to life in prison.

See also
List of kidnappings
List of solved missing person cases

References

External links
Jessica Keen Memorial

1975 births
1990s missing person cases
1991 deaths
1991 murders in the United States
American murder victims
Deaths by beating in the United States
Formerly missing people
Incidents of violence against women
Kidnapped American children
Missing person cases in Ohio
Murdered American children
People from Columbus, Ohio
People murdered in Ohio